Actor Ichikawa Shikō as Katō Yomoshichi from the series Tales of Retainers of Unswerving Loyalty is an ukiyo-e woodblock print by Osaka-based late Edo period print designer  (fl. c. 1819-1863). Each of the three sheets contains a different version of the same image, reflecting progressive stages in the woodblock printing process.
The print is a portrait of a contemporary kabuki actor in the role of a samurai, and belongs to a series of images of heroes. The print belongs to the permanent collection of the Prince Takamado Gallery of Japanese Art in the Royal Ontario Museum, Canada.

Print details
 Medium:  woodblock print; ink and colour on paper
 Size: 
 Format: 3  single sheet prints 
 Genre: ,  actor print,  large head portrait
 Japanese title: 「忠烈義士伝」 「加藤与茂七」 [Chūretsu gishiden Katō Yomoshichi] 
 Exhibit title: Actor Ichikawa Shikō as Katō Yomoshichi from the series Tales of Retainers of Unswerving Loyalty in 3 versions
 Date: c. 1848
 Inscription: none
 Signature: 廣貞 [Hirosada] in upper half along right edge
 Publisher's mark: none visible  
 Censor seal: none
 Date seal: none
 Credit line: none

Artist
Despite his status as "the most important and prolific mid-nineteenth century Osaka designer," little is known of Hirosada's personal details. The few biographies listing his life dates identify his birth year as unknown and that of his death as 1864 or 1865. Art historians link his activity to between 1810 and 1865. He has been acknowledged as "the central figure of mid-nineteenth century Osaka printmaking." He was very prolific, producing predominantly kabuki-e and yakusha-e chūban prints. He is particularly known for his ōkubi-e (lit. "large head") portraits of leading Osaka actors such as this print.

Some have suggested that Hirosada and his contemporary  (fl. 1830-1847) were the same person; however, this remains unproven.

Subject

Ichikawa Shikō III
He was born the son of a carpenter, but became the student then adopted son of kabuki actor . He was known by various names during his career including the following:
 Stage names
 
  (1/1844-1/1846)
  (1/1846-8/1850)
  (8/1850-?)
 Yagō guild name
 
 Haimyō poetry name
 
 
The last known mention of his name in print is in 1851, so it is presumed that he died in this year or soon after.

Kanadehon Chūshingura
This print and the several others in the series from which it is taken depict characters from a staging of the play  performed in Osaka in the third month of 1848. The play was originally written for the bunraku puppet theatre by Takeda Izumo II, Miyoshi Shōraku and Namiki Senryū I in 1748, and adapted for kabuki later that year. It remains one of the most famous and popular plays in the kabuki repertoire.

A jidaimono historical drama, the play tells the ostensibly true and pervasively enduring story of a 1702 incident known as the Akō Affair, in which 47 loyal retainers of a wronged lord avenged his death then committed ritual seppuku suicide. The story of the 47 ronin has long been repeated and romanticized as an idealization of the bushido ethos, and held particular appeal during the latter half of the Tokugawa era  despite, or perhaps in part due to, strict censorship imposed on re-tellings of the incident by the shogunate.

Series
The print belongs to a series of six known prints translated as Tales of Retainers of Unswerving Loyalty or The Exemplary Loyalty of the Faithful Samurai. Like the characters from the play depicted in each image from the series, Katō Yomoshichi is one of the loyal retainers of the provincial lord Enya Hangan. The others are as follows:

 

 

 

 

 

Hirosada produced multiple albums of this type portraying popular actors of the day as heroic warriors, including 忠孝武勇伝 (Chūka buyūden) ("Tales of Loyalty and Filial Devotion") and 高名武勇伝 (Kōmei buyūden) ("Tales of Brave Warriors of Renown" or "Tales of Renowned Heroes"), both issued in 1848. Doesburg has argued that such collections are attempts to circumvent censorship of kabuki-themed ukiyo-e under the Tenpō Reforms by cloaking the dramatic content within titles suggesting the promotion of moral values and "suggesting that the portraits were actually representations of famous men and women from history and legend".

Medium and genre

Kamigata-e
Gaining prominence about a century after the emergence of ukiyo-e in Edo, kamigata-e were predominantly  (images of kabuki actors), and were produced almost exclusively by amateur “talented kabuki fans” promoting their favourite actors.

Kabuki-e
Literally 'kabuki pictures', kabuki-e began to be produced in Edo in the late seventeenth century. Further subgenres of yakusha-e include  bust portraits,  full-length portraits,  parody pictures, and  death portraits.

Ōkubi-e
Hirosada's print bears many of the typical marks of this genre including the plain background, the dramatic posing of the hands and arms, and the emphasis on facial features and make-up. Hirosada is particularly associated with this genre of print due to both the number and quality of works of this type that he produced.

Copies in other collections

See also
 View of Tempōzan Park in Naniwa (Gochōtei Sadamasu) - kamigata-e print in same collection
 Actor Arashi Rikan II as Osome (Ryūsai Shigeharu) - kamigata-e print in same collection
 Bust portrait of Actor Kataoka Ichizō I (Gochōtei Sadamasu II) - kamigata-e print in same collection
 Ryūsai Shigeharu - kamigata-e artist
 Three Travellers before a Waterfall (Ryūsai Shigeharu) - kamigata-e print in same collection
 Actor Nakamura Shikan II as Satake Shinjuro (Shungyosai Hokusei) - kamigata-e print in same collection
 Two Actors in Samurai Roles (Gosotei Hirosada) - print in same collection by same artist

Notes

References

External links 

Works by Gosotei Hirosada
Kabuki